The Reporter is an American drama series that aired on CBS from September 25 to December 18, 1964. The series was created by Jerome Weidman and developed by executive producers Keefe Brasselle and John Simon.

Guest stars
 Nick Adams
 Eddie Albert
 Edward Asner
 Dyan Cannon
 Richard Conte
 Herb Edelman
 James Farentino
 Anne Francis
 Frank Gifford
 Arthur Hill
 Shirley Knight
 Jack Lord
 Nan Martin
 Archie Moore
 Simon Oakland
 Warren Oates
 Claude Rains
 Paul Richards
 Robert Ryan
 Pippa Scott
 William Shatner
 Barry Sullivan
 Roy Thinnes
 Daniel J. Travanti
 Franchot Tone
 Rip Torn
 Jessica Walter
 Efrem Zimbalist, Jr.

Episodes

References

External links
 

1964 American television series debuts
1964 American television series endings
1960s American drama television series
Black-and-white American television shows
CBS original programming
English-language television shows
Television series by CBS Studios
Television shows set in New York City